is the former (18th generation) head of the main Tokugawa house. He is the son of Ichirō Matsudaira and Toyoko Tokugawa. His great-grandfather was the famed Matsudaira Katamori of Aizu and his paternal great-grandfather was Tokugawa Iesato. As a great-grandson of Shimazu Tadayoshi, the last lord of Satsuma Domain, he is also a second cousin of the former Emperor, Akihito.

Tsunenari was active for many years in the shipping company Nippon Yūsen, retiring in June, 2002, and is the head of the nonprofit Tokugawa Foundation. The nonprofit aims to preserve the remaining cultural treasures of the Tokugawa family, many of which were lost in the Meiji Restoration and World War II U.S. bombings. In 2007, Tsunenari published a book entitled Edo no idenshi (江戸の遺伝子), released in English in 2009 as The Edo Inheritance, which seeks to counter the common belief among Japanese that the Edo period (throughout which members of his Tokugawa clan ruled Japan as shōguns) was like a Dark Age, when Japan, cut off from the world, fell behind. On the contrary, he argues, the roughly 250 years of peace and relative prosperity saw great economic reforms, the growth of a sophisticated urban culture, and the development of the most urbanized society on the planet.

His son, Iehiro Tokugawa, is an author and translator.

Family

 Paternal Grandfather: Tsuneo Matsudaira
 Maternal Grandfather: Iemasa Tokugawa
 Father: Ichirō Matsudaira
 Mother: Toyoko Tokugawa
 Aunt: Setsuko, Princess Chichibu
 Wife: Sachiko Terashima
 Son: Iehiro Tokugawa
 Grandcousin: Nagahisa Kuroda,Munefusa Tokugawa,Akihito, Masahito, Prince Hitachi, Yoshitomo Tokugawa

Ancestry

Patrilineal descent

Tokugawa's patriline is the line from which he is descended father to son.

The existence of a verifiable link between the Nitta clan and the Tokugawa/Matsudaira clan remains somewhat in dispute.

Descent prior to Keitai is unclear to modern historians, but traditionally traced back patrilineally to Emperor Jimmu
Emperor Keitai, ca. 450–534
Emperor Kinmei, 509–571
Emperor Bidatsu, 538–585
Prince Oshisaka, ca. 556–???
Emperor Jomei, 593–641
Emperor Tenji, 626–671
Prince Shiki, ????–716
Emperor Kōnin, 709–786
Emperor Kanmu, 737–806
Emperor Saga, 786–842
Emperor Ninmyō, 810–850
Emperor Montoku 826–858
Emperor Seiwa, 850–881
Prince Sadazumi, 873–916
Minamoto no Tsunemoto, 894–961
Minamoto no Mitsunaka, 912–997
Minamoto no Yorinobu, 968–1048
Minamoto no Yoriyoshi, 988–1075
Minamoto no Yoshiie, 1039–1106
Minamoto no Yoshikuni, 1091–1155
Minamoto no Yoshishige, 1135–1202
Nitta Yoshikane, 1139–1206
Nitta Yoshifusa, 1162–1195
Nitta Masayoshi, 1187–1257
Nitta Masauji, 1208–1271
Nitta Motouji, 1253–1324
Nitta Tomouji, 1274–1318
Nitta Yoshisada, 1301–1338
Nitta Yoshimune, 1331?–1368
Tokugawa Chikasue?, ????–???? (speculated)
Tokugawa Arichika, ????–????
Matsudaira Chikauji, d. 1393?
Matsudaira Yasuchika, ????–14??
Matsudaira Nobumitsu, c. 1404–1488/89?
Matsudaira Chikatada, 1430s–1501
Masudaira Nagachika, 1473–1544
Matsudaira Nobutada, 1490–1531
Matsudaira Kiyoyasu, 1511–1536
Matsudaira Hirotada, 1526–1549
Tokugawa Ieyasu, 1st Tokugawa shōgun (1543–1616)
Tokugawa Yorifusa, 1st daimyō of Mito (1603–1661)
Matsudaira Yorishige, 1st daimyō of Takamatsu (1622–1695)
Matsudaira Yoriyuki (1661–1687)
Matsudaira Yoritoyo, 3rd daimyō of Takamatsu (1680–1735)
Tokugawa Munetaka, 4th daimyō of Mito (1705–1730)
Tokugawa Munemoto, 5th daimyō of Mito (1728–1766)
Tokugawa Harumori, 6th daimyō of Mito (1751–1805) 
Matsudaira Yoshinari, 9th daimyō of Takasu (1776–1832) 
Matsudaira Yoshitatsu, 10th daimyō of Takasu (1800–1862) 
Matsudaira Katamori, 9th daimyō of Aizu (1836–1893) 
Tsuneo Matsudaira (1877–1949) 
Ichirō Matsudaira (1907–1992) 
Tsunenari Tokugawa (born 1940)

References

External links 
 Homepage of the Tokugawa Memorial Foundation

 heir: Iehiro Tokugawa

1940 births
Living people
Aizu-Matsudaira clan
Gakushuin University alumni
Japanese businesspeople
People from Tokyo
Tokugawa clan